Francisco José Coragem Jordão (born 30 December 1979 in Lisbon, Portugal) is a Portuguese basketball player. He measures 2.00 metres and plays as a forward.

External links
 EuroBasket 2007 Profile

1979 births
Living people
Portuguese men's basketball players
Sportspeople from Lisbon
Atlético Petróleos de Luanda basketball players
C.D. Primeiro de Agosto men's basketball players
S.L. Benfica basketball players
Small forwards
Power forwards (basketball)